The Kennel Club of Pakistan (KCP) is a non-profit kennel club in Pakistan. The organization's main functions are to register pure-bred dogs and to act as governing body for the sport of pure-bred dogs. Its activities include maintenance of pedigree documentation, dog shows, working trials, field trials, obedience classes and tests. The club has reciprocal arrangements with the American Kennel Club and the Kennel Club of England.

History 
The KCP was formed in 1947, and was soon affiliated by the Kennel Club of England. A few years ago, the American Kennel Club made a reciprocal agreement with the KCP. In 2006, the Asia Kennel Union gave the KCP membership.

Affiliations 
 Fédération Cynologique Internationale (FCI) - Contract Partner
 The Kennel Club (KC) - Affiliate
 Asian Kennel Union - Member
 American Kennel Club - Reciprocal Arrangement

External links 
Kennel Club of Pakistan

Kennel clubs
Animal welfare organisations based in Pakistan
Organizations established in 1947